Southam and Long Itchington railway station was a railway station on the Weedon to Leamington Spa branch line that served the town of Southam and the village of Long Itchington in Warwickshire, England.

The brick built station was opened on 1 August 1895 along with the other stations on the Daventry to Marton Junction extension of the Daventry line. The station had two platforms, one being served by a passing loop with its main station facilities being located on the other. The last passenger train ran on 15 September 1958. However, the line continued to carry freight, mainly cement, until 1 August 1985.

See also
Southam Road and Harbury railway station

References

External links
 Southam & Long Itchington Station on navigable 1954 O. S. map
 Southam & Long Itchington Station on Warwickshire Railways
 LNWR Map

Disused railway stations in Warwickshire
Railway stations in Great Britain opened in 1895
Railway stations in Great Britain closed in 1958
Former London and North Western Railway stations